Dong-hyuk, also spelled Dong-hyeok or Tong-hyok, is a Korean masculine given name. Its meaning differs based on the hanja used to write each syllable of the name. There are 24 hanja with the reading "dong" and nine hanja with the reading "hyuk" on the South Korean government's official list of hanja which may be registered for use in given names.

People with this name include:

Entertainers and musicians
Hwang Dong-hyuk (born 1971), South Korean film director
Jo Dong-hyuk (born 1977), South Korean actor
Dong-Hyek Lim (born 1984), South Korean pianist

Sportspeople
Park Dong-hyuk (born 1979), South Korean football defender (K-League Classic)
Jang Dong-hyuk (born 1983), South Korean football midfielder (Korea National League)
Kwak Dong-hyuk (born 1983), South Korean volleyball player
Kwon Tong-hyok (born 1985), North Korean sport shooter
Shin Dong-hyuk (footballer) (born 1987), South Korean football midfielder (K-League Classic)
An Dong-hyeok (born 1988), South Korean football midfielder (K-League Challenge)

Other
Shin Dong-hyuk (born 1982), North Korean defector living in South Korea
Kim Tong-hyok, North Korean politician, chosen to represent Changkyong Constituency in the 2014 North Korean parliamentary election

Fictional characters
Shin Dong-hyuk (Hotelier), in 2001 South Korean television series Hotelier

See also
List of Korean given names

References

Korean masculine given names